Smoking bans in private vehicles are enacted to protect passengers from secondhand smoke and to increase road traffic safety, e.g. by preventing the driver from being distracted by the act of smoking. Smoking bans in private vehicles are less common than bans extended to public transport or vehicles used during work, like trucks or police cars.

Traffic security
The acts of looking for, reaching for, and then lighting cigarettes can considerably distract the driver. A burning cigarette that has fallen into the driver's lap might lead to panic-like reactions. Cigarette stubs thrown out of a window pose a serious fire threat. Some serious traffic accidents in Germany are known to have been caused by a lit cigarette.
Some German tribunals have commented on the imprudence of smoking while driving. Smoking may be compared to using a cell phone while driving, which is also banned in some jurisdictions.

Protection from secondhand smoke
More recently, the dangers of secondhand smoke (SHS) have seen more attention, and smoking in a car (whether in motion or not) is banned in some jurisdictions as a measure against passive smoking. SHS, also called environmental tobacco smoke (ETS), is a mixture of two forms of smoke that come from burning tobacco. Mainstream smoke is the smoke exhaled by a smoker. Sidestream smoke is smoke from the lighted end of a cigarette, pipe, or cigar, or tobacco burning in a hookah. This type of smoke has higher concentrations of cancer-causing agents (carcinogens) and is more toxic than mainstream smoke. It also has smaller particles than mainstream smoke. These smaller particles make their way into the lungs and the body’s cells more easily. When non-smokers are exposed to SHS, it is called involuntary smoking or passive smoking. Non-smokers who breathe in SHS take in nicotine and toxic chemicals the same way smokers do. The more SHS someone breathes, the higher the levels of these harmful chemicals in their body.
Some laws stipulate that such a ban applies only when a passenger is under a certain age. A research study showed that after smoking one cigarette in a car, the time required for respirable particles' concentration to return to its initial value, depending on car movement cases, windows positions and ventilation settings, varies between 10 and 60 minutes.

Wildfires
Cigarettes or cigarette litter thrown out of the window of cars moving through a vegetated area (particularly during the hot season) is one of the causes of wildfires or bushfires. A southern France firefighters' department statistic attributes 16% of local bushfires to cigarette litter thrown out of moving vehicles (and 13.8% to cigarette litter from pedestrians).

Jurisdictions with a smoking ban in private vehicles

Australia

In the Australian Capital Territory, a smoking ban in cars with minors under the age of 16 has existed since May 2012. An on the spot fine of AUD $150 will be applicable for individuals or $750 for companies. Court fines may be higher. The ban includes cigarettes and personal vaporisers/e-cigarettes.

In New South Wales a smoking ban in cars with minors under the age of 16 has existed since July 2009. There is an on the spot fine of AUD $250 for drivers or passengers, with a maximum fine of AUD $1,100 if unsuccessfully disputed/appealed. An amendment added e-cigarettes on 1 December 2015.

In the Northern Territory a smoking ban in cars with minors under the age of 16 has existed since December 2014, the last jurisdiction in Australia to do so.

In Queensland a smoking ban in cars with minors under the age of 16 has existed since January 2010. Smoking-related offences are based on a unit price of $133.45 with offences charged in multiples of the unit price. As of 1 July 2019, smoking in cars with children is two units, or $266.90

In South Australia a smoking ban in cars with minors under the age of 16 has existed since May 2007. The maximum fine is AUD $750 with a AUD $105 expiation fee.

In Tasmania a smoking ban in cars with minors under the age of 18 has existed since 1 January 2008. There is a AUD $110 on the spot fine.

In Victoria a smoking ban in cars with minors under the age of 18 has existed since 1 January 2010.

In Western Australia a smoking ban in cars with minors under the age of 17 has existed since 22 September 2010.

Bahrain
Since 13 April 2009, smoking in cars with accompanying children is banned in Bahrain.

Canada
Smoking with anyone under the age of 16 present in a vehicle is currently banned in the Provinces of Alberta, British Columbia, Newfoundland and Labrador, Manitoba, Ontario, New Brunswick, Prince Edward Island, Saskatchewan and Yukon Territory. Smoking is banned in vehicles with persons under the age of 19 present in Nova Scotia.

Cyprus
On Cyprus smoking in vehicles with minors under the age of 16 is prohibited.

France
It is forbidden to smoke in private vehicles in the presence of children under the age of 12 since 2015.

Greece
Greece introduced fines of up to 3,000 Euros for smoking in a vehicle with a minor (a child under 12 years old) in 2019.

Mauritius
On Mauritius smoking is prohibited in any car carrying passengers, since 2008.

New Zealand
New Zealand banned smoking in any vehicle carrying a person under 18 years old (unless the person under 18 is the driver) from June 2020, and vaping from November 2021 with fines of NZ$50 applying.

South Africa
A law prohibiting smoking in private vehicles with minors under the age of 12 has been voted.

Turkey 
In Turkey, smoking in the vehicle has been prohibited since 2013 with the law numbered 4207 in accordance with the smoke-free air policy. People who smoke are subject to fines.

United Arab Emirates
On 6 January 2010, a federal law (superseding the smoking bans which already existed in most of the emirates) was signed. Among other provisions, it introduces a smoking ban in private vehicles in the presence of children under the age of 12.

United Kingdom
On 1 October 2015, smoking in vehicles with passengers under 18 was banned in England and Wales, except in convertibles. It is also illegal for drivers under the age of 18 to allow other passengers to smoke in their car, regardless of their age – however drivers under the age of 18 will be permitted to smoke in their car as long as no passengers are present. It is a criminal offence for any driver to fail to stop a passenger illegally smoking in the car while a passenger under the age of 18 is present.

Scotland enacted a ban on 5 December 2016.

While a ban was approved in 2016 in Northern Ireland, it has yet to be enacted.

Smoking is not allowed in work vehicles that more than one person uses. Smoking in company cars is allowed, provided that there is only one user of the car and the employer allows.

Jersey
In Jersey smoking has been banned in all vehicles carrying passengers under the age of 18. Drivers under the age of 18 (the legal driving age in Jersey is 17) are also forbidden to smoke whilst in their own vehicles, even if they are the only passengers. The law came into force on 1 September 2015, after debate in the States Assembly and is the first place in the British Isles to enact a ban of this sort.

United States
Smoking in cars with children under 18 was banned in the state of California in 2007, and is banned in certain counties and cities of Hawaii, Indiana, Kansas, New Jersey, New York, Kentucky, Alabama and Illinois.

A smoking ban in cars with children is being tested in the states of Arkansas (child's age <14), Louisiana (<13), Maine (<16), Oregon (<18), Puerto Rico (<13), Utah (<15), Vermont (<8), and Virginia (<8).

CPS may also be involved if the smoker is the legal guardian of the children present.

Planned smoking bans in private vehicles

Finland
Finland intends to ban smoking in cars while children are present. Furthermore, smoking in places where children are present is to be banned generally.

Israel
In Israel the introduction of a smoking ban in cars is being discussed in the Knesset.

Netherlands
Similar plans exist in the Netherlands.

Taiwan

Taiwan plans to ban smoking while driving a car, riding a bike or walking on a sidewalk.  The rationale is the concern about traffic security and air pollution.

External links
Tobacco Free awareness action - How many people smoke in cars

References 

Road safety
Smoking
Tobacco control
Traffic law